China–Croatia relations refer to bilateral foreign relations between China and Croatia. Both countries established diplomatic relations on May 13, 1992. Croatia has an embassy in Beijing and a general consulate in Hong Kong. China has embassy and Confucius Institute in Zagreb.

History 
Croatian President Stjepan Mesić made a state visit to China on May 16, 2002, while Chinese president Hu Jintao made a state visit to Croatia on June 19, 2009.

On May 21, 2007, Croatian Foreign Minister Kolinda Grabar-Kitarović visited Beijing.

Economic relations 
The People's Republic of China is with Japan the most important Croatian trading partner in East Asia. The volume of trade between the two countries in 2013 was US$1.495 billion with Croatian exports taking US$105 million, and Chinese US$1.390 billion.

Culture and education 
Educational and cultural cooperation between the two countries is being maintained under the Agreement on cultural cooperation that was concluded in March 1993.

University of Zagreb offers major in Sinology since October 2004, while Beijing Foreign Studies University offers a major in Croatian.

The Confucius Institute in Zagreb was opened in May 2012.

In May 2013, China and Croatia signed "Plan for Cooperation in Education for the Period of 2013-2016", providing yearly scholarships to Chinese and Croatian students.

See also
 Foreign relations of China
 Foreign relations of Croatia 
 China–European Union relations
 China–Yugoslavia relations
 China–Serbia relations

References

 
Croatia
China, Peoples Republic